The Negro Southern League (NSL) was one of the several Negro baseball leagues created during the time organized baseball was segregated.  The NSL was organized as a minor league in 1920 and lasted until 1936.  It was considered a major league for the 1932 season and it was also the only organized league to finish its full schedule that season (primarily due to the Great Depression).  Prior to the season, several established teams joined the NSL, mainly from the collapsed Negro National League.

League history

Founding

The Negro Southern League was a Negro baseball league organized by Tom Wilson in 1920 as a minor league. Leagues in the depression-era Southern United States were far less organized and lucrative than those in the north, owing to a smaller population base and a lower standard of living. The NSL operated on an irregular basis as each season's schedule was depended upon the availability of the more prominent team owners who were quick to seek more profitable avenues whenever possible.

Hiatuses

The NSL did not organize a schedule for the 1924, 1925 or 1928 seasons due to the Birmingham Black Barons and Memphis Red Sox participating in the Negro National League those years.  The remaining NSL teams all played independent schedules those years. The 1929 season was poorly attended and teams struggled to complete their schedules; Birmingham and Memphis did not participate. For the 1930 season, the Nashville Elite Giants and Louisville Black Caps left for the NNL; this, and the continued absence of Birmingham and Memphis, led to the 1930 season being scrapped.  The remaining NSL teams played independent schedules that year, while the New Orleans Caulfield Ads moved to the Texas–Louisiana League.

Level of play

For most of its existence, the NSL was considered a minor league, with some teams providing talent to more profitable Negro league teams.  The most notable example is the Monroe Monarchs acting as a farm team for the Kansas City Monarchs.

The Negro National League collapsed for good after the 1931 season and many players (and two teams) migrated to the NSL.  The Great Depression had decimated the profits of most Negro league teams and only a few organized Negro leagues survived; the newly formed East-West League also folded in mid-1932. The NSL was considered the highest quality surviving league and it therefore became the de facto major league for the 1932 season. The NSL was the only organized league to complete their full schedule.

With the creation of a new Negro National League in 1933, many players and some teams left the NSL and it slipped back into being regarded as having minor league status.

Legacy

When the NSL collapsed for the last time after the 1936 season, some of its member teams folded as well, but a handful of the teams continued on.  The Nashville Elite Giants excelled in the new Negro National League for years, while the Memphis Red Sox and Birmingham Black Barons excelled in the Negro American League, which was newly organized in time for the 1937 season and absorbed some NSL teams when the league collapsed.

On the eve of integration in 1945, a new minor Negro league was organized with teams in the South; it assumed the name of the old league and also called itself the Negro Southern League.  This second NSL lasted until 1951.

Negro Southern League franchises

Eight franchises competed in what many consider the first "minor league" season in 1920. They were the Montgomery Grey Sox, Atlanta Black Crackers, New Orleans Caulfield Ads, Knoxville Giants, Birmingham Black Barons, Nashville White Sox, Pensacola Giants and Jacksonville Stars. Below is a list of teams that competed in the Negro Southern League.

Note: An "associate team" is one who is not a member of the league, but games played against them by league teams count in the league standings.

1932: Major league status

Eight franchises competed in the league in 1932, the sole season the Negro Southern League was considered a major Negro league:

 Atlanta Black Crackers
 Cole's American Giants
 Indianapolis ABCs
 Louisville Black Caps; moved to Columbus and became the Columbus Turfs during the 1932 season
 Memphis Red Sox
 Monroe Monarchs
 Montgomery Grey Sox
 Nashville Elite Giants

Member timeline

Below is a timeline of teams that played more than one season in the NSL:

1920 – Formation of NSL consisting of 8 teams: Montgomery Grey Sox, Atlanta Black Crackers, New Orleans Caulfield Ads, Knoxville Giants, Birmingham Black Barons, Nashville White Sox, Pensacola Giants and Jacksonville Stars.
1921 – Dropped: Nashville White Sox, Pensacola Giants and Jacksonville Stars; Added: Nashville Elite Giants, Memphis Red Sox and Chattanooga Tigers.
1922 – Dropped: Atlanta Black Crackers, Birmingham Black Barons and New Orleans Caulfield Ads (mid-June); Added: Louisville Stars and New Orleans Crescent Stars (mid-June).
1923 – Dropped: Knoxville Giants, Louisville Stars, Montgomery Grey Sox and Chattanooga Tigers; Added: Birmingham Black Barons.
(1924) – no schedule played
(1925) – no schedule played
1926 – Dropped: New Orleans Crescent Stars; Added: New Orleans Caulfield Ads, Albany Giants, Montgomery Grey Sox, Atlanta Black Crackers and Chattanooga Black Lookouts.
1927 – Dropped: Birmingham Black Barons, Memphis Red Sox, Albany Giants, Montgomery Grey Sox and New Orleans Caulfield Ads; Added: Evansville Louis Reichert Giants, Bessemer Grey Sox, Hopkinsville Athletics and Jackson Cubs.
(1928) – no schedule played
1929 – Dropped: Bessemer Grey Sox, Hopkinsville Athletics and Jackson Cubs; Added: Louisville Black Caps and New Orleans Caulfield Ads.
(1930) – no schedule played
1931 – Dropped: Evansville Louis Reichert Giants, Atlanta Black Crackers, Louisville Black Caps and New Orleans Caulfield Ads; Added: Birmingham Black Barons, Memphis Red Sox, Knoxville Giants and Montgomery Grey Sox.
1932 – Dropped: Chattanooga Black Lookouts and Knoxville Giants; Added: Cole's American Giants, Monroe Monarchs, Little Rock Grays, Louisville Black Caps, Indianapolis ABC's, Atlanta Black Crackers and Cleveland Cubs.
1933 – Dropped: Cole's American Giants, Nashville Elite Giants, Little Rock Grays, Louisville Black Caps, Indianapolis ABC's, Birmingham Black Barons, Atlanta Black Crackers and Cleveland Cubs; Added: Little Rock Stars, New Orleans Crescent Stars, Shreveport Cubs, Algiers Giants, Jackson Senators and Alexandria Lincoln Giants.
1934 – Dropped: Little Rock Stars, Shreveport Cubs, Algiers Giants, Jackson Senators and Alexandria Lincoln Giants; Added: Cincinnati Tigers, Birmingham Black Barons and Louisville Caps.
1935 – Dropped: Monroe Monarchs, Louisville Caps, Cincinnati Tigers and New Orleans Crescent Stars; Added: Claybrook Tigers, New Orleans Caulfield Ads, Atlanta Black Crackers, Chattanooga Black Lookouts and Montgomery Grey Sox.
1936 – Dropped: Claybrook Tigers and New Orleans Caulfield Ads; Added: Cincinnati Tigers, Nashville Black Vols and Hopkinsville Athletics. League fell apart before second-half ended.

League champions

Most seasons were split in halves, with the winner of the first half of the season playing the winner of the second half of the season in a formal league play-off that decided the Pennant winner.  For some years it is unclear if a split season was played and if the second half schedule was completed.  In the below list, the first half winner is noted with a raised "1" and the second half winner is noted with a raised "2".

Pennant winners

 1920: Montgomery Grey Sox
 1921: Nashville Elite Giants
 1922: Nashville Elite Giants
 1923: Birmingham Black Barons
 (1924): no schedule played
 (1925): no schedule played
 1926: Birmingham Black Barons
 1927: Chattanooga Black Lookouts
 (1928): no schedule played
 1929: Nashville Elite Giants
 (1930): no schedule played
 1931: Nashville Elite Giants
 1932: Cole's American Giants
 1933: Memphis Red Sox(1st half) /New Orleans Crescent Stars(2nd half)
 1934: Undetermined
 1935: Claybrook Tigers
 1936: Birmingham Black Barons

League playoffs

 1921: Nashville Elite Giants defeated Montgomery Grey Sox, 4g-1g
 1926: Birmingham Black Barons1 defeated Memphis Red Sox2, 5g-2g (3 ties)
 1932: Cole's American Giants1 defeated Nashville Elite Giants2, 5g-3g
 1935: Claybrook Tigers2 defeated Memphis Red Sox1, 4g-3g

Negro Dixie Series

The Negro Dixie Series was an informal "championship" series between a top NSL team and the champion of one of the various Texas-based Negro leagues.  Oddly, the NSL participant was usually not the league champion.

 1927: Nashville Elite Giants (NSL) defeated Dallas Black Giants (of the Negro Texas League), 4g-1g
 1931: Monroe Monarchs (of the Texas–Louisiana Negro League) defeated Nashville Elite Giants (NSL), no details
 1932: Monroe Monarchs (NSL) defeated Austin (of the Texas–Louisiana Negro League), 4g-2g
 1933: New Orleans Crescent Stars (NSL) tied Nashville Elite Giants (of the NNL2), 4g-4g
 1933 (first round): New Orleans Crescent Stars defeated Houston Black Buffaloes (of the Negro Texas League), 4g-0g

After the completion of the 1933 Negro Dixie Series, the Chicago American Giants challenged the Crescent Stars to a "self-proclaimed" Negro World Series.  The American Giants had their claim to the NNL first-half title dismissed by the league president, who also happened to be the owner of the team who did claim the first-half title (Pittsburgh Crawfords).  In response, Chicago held their own championship series, and defeated the Crescent Stars, 5 games to 1.

References

External links
 Negro Southern League Museum Research Center

Negro baseball leagues
Defunct baseball leagues in the United States
Baseball leagues in Alabama
Baseball leagues in Arkansas
Baseball leagues in Florida
Baseball leagues in Georgia (U.S. state)
Baseball leagues in Kentucky
Baseball leagues in Illinois
Baseball leagues in Indiana
Baseball leagues in Louisiana
Baseball leagues in Ohio
Baseball leagues in Tennessee
Sports leagues established in 1920